Gracilechinus is a genus of sea urchins in the family Echinidae.

Description and characteristics 
The species in this genus are regular sea urchins, with a rounded test, bearing the anus at the top and the mouth at the bottom. They are extremely similar to species in the genus Echinus, but are differentiated by a primary tubercle on every interambulacral plate.

Most species in this genus are abyssal, and live in the North Atlantic or close cold seas.

Species
Species in this genus include:

References

Gracilechinus